Anantham is an Indian Tamil-language family drama streaming television series directed by V. Priya. Produced by Happy Unicorn the series stars Prakash Raj in the lead role along with Sampath Raj, John Vijay, Arjunan, Mathew Varghese and Indraja. The series comprised eight episodes and was released on ZEE5 on 22 April 2022.

Synopsis
Anantham is a home that has sheltered several families and witnessed many life stories. When Ananth returns to Anantham, he learns about the various families who lived there since his parents moved out.

Cast
 Prakash Raj as Venkatesan
 Aravinth Sundar as Young Venkatesan
 Sampath Raj as Ananth
 Vinoth Kishan as Young Ananth
 Indraja as Maragatham
 Samyuktha Shan as Young Maragatham
 John Vijay as Ramu
 Vivek Rajgopal as Young Ramu
 Arjunan as Ramani
 Sai Raghul as Young Ramani
 Mathew Varghese as Ramasamy
 Anbu Thasan as Young Ramasamy
 Sree Kavi as Sundari
 Namita krishnamurthy as Young Sundari
 Amrutha Srinivasan as Seetha
 Vivek Prasanna as Sandeep Sekaran
 Mekha as Rekha
 Madhuri Watts as Chitra
 Anjali Rao as Lalitha
 Abishek Joseph George as Balakrishnan
 Param Guganesh as Young Balu
 George Kora as Krishnan Menon.
 Lakshmi Gopalaswamy as Saroja
 Vinodhini as Shailaja
 Ananya Ramprasad as Sujatha
 Mirna Menon as Parvathy
 Kanishka as Young Paravathy
 Laguparan as Chander
 Anusha Swamy as Kavitha
 Dindigul Saravanan as Maali

Reception
The series opened to positive reviews. Navein Darshan of The Indian Express rated the series with 3.5/5 stars, stating that, "Anantham is an endearing series, despite the blemishes. During a crucial moment in the series, Venkatesan [Prakash Raj] speaks of the importance of dying without regret or guilt; he thinks of it as the perfect ending. Likewise, the climax of a story and the emotion it leaves you with is equally important. Unfortunately, Anantham bypasses its golden moment for conclusion and instead chooses to leave us with an ineffective cliffhanger. Well, at least, Venkatesan gets a satisfying end." Soundarya Athimuthu of The Quint told, "Anantham' is an endearing series about acceptance with gold intentions despite its imperfections. It makes you feel at home with its underlying theme to accept with love despite imperfections. As an audience member, one tends to love Anantham for its gold intentions despite its imperfections." S.Subhakeerthana of OTTPlay said, "There is a lot of heart in Anantham though often it gets stuck in melodrama. Nevertheless I recommend that you watch this thoughtful ." Ashameera Aiyappan of Firstpost wrote, "Anantham, even in the weaker portions, is thoughtful, inclusive, and shows a lot of heart. It is not perfect. Its murals are often cut into by snakey cracks. It ends on a cliffhanger that feels forced. But even in the weaker portions, the film is thoughtful, inclusive, and shows a lot of heart. For that, my love for Anantham is infinite."

Episodes

References

External links 
 Anantham at ZEE5
 

ZEE5 original programming
Tamil-language web series
2022 Tamil-language television series debuts
2022 Tamil-language television series endings
Tamil-language melodrama television series